Estacado is a ghost town in Crosby and Lubbock Counties in the U.S. state of Texas.  Located along Farm to Market Road 1527, it was established in 1879 as a Religious Society of Friends (Quaker) colony by Paris Cox and originally named Maryetta after his wife. In 1886, it became the first government seat of Crosby County. In 1936, Recorded Texas Historic Landmark number 4779 was designated to commemorate the founding of Estacado.

Paris Cox
Paris Cox (1846–1888) was born one of six children in a devout Religious Society of Friends family near Asheboro, North Carolina. During the Civil War, Cox was given a legal exemption from military service, based on the Quaker precept of pacifism.

As treasurer of the North Carolina fellowship of Quakers, Cox was instrumental in helping the Religious Society of Friends, known as Quakers,  find a favorable location for both farming and freedom from religious persecution. Their first move from North Carolina was to Indiana. Cox married Mary C. Ferguson during the sojourn in Westfield, Indiana.

After some investigation, Cox purchased several thousand acres in Texas in 1877 and 1878, at 25 cents an acre. He first saw the Llano Estacado in 1878 when guided by buffalo hunters. There, he met local rancher Henry Clay Smith.  Cox arranged for Smith to plant experimental crops on some acreage and send the results to Cox in Indiana.

Establishment
During the winter of 1879, the first white farmer settlers began to move into the Texas South Plains. The first families were named Cox, Stubbs, Spray, and Hayworth. Paris Cox first named the area Maryetta (or Marietta) after his wife. Cox had the only real home when he built a sod house. The other families were ill-prepared for the harsh winter, and only had tents for living quarters. With the spring thaw, the original colonists deserted the area. Only the Cox family remained.

Determined to succeed, Cox stayed and eventually brought in a successful crop. Dr. William Hunt, who  became postmaster in 1884, visited the area, and later wrote:

The colony began to be repopulated by new families in 1881.

In 1886, Crosby County was organized, and Estacado became the county seat. In 1888, $10,000 in bonds were issued to erect a courthouse.
The town flourished for some years, and by 1890, the population was reported at 200.

Post office
A post office was established in 1881, with George W. Singer as postmaster. The town name was changed from Maryetta to Estacaddo. In 1884, the spelling was changed to Estacado. The last Estacado postmaster was John A. Eaves, when, on September 24, 1918, the post office was discontinued and mail service routed to Petersburg.

Education
The Quakers established Crosby County's first education system in 1882, when Emma Hunt taught six students in a sod dugout. Two years later, the classes moved to the Quaker meeting house and the students were given patent desks. In 1886, two teachers earned $45 a month to instruct 32 students. In 1889, the Quakers established the Central Plains Academy, with the Harvard- and Johns Hopkins University-educated Rev. Jesse Moore as president of the college. Mrs. Moore, who also had a degree from Johns Hopkins, taught music, voice, and violin classes. E.C. and Elva Lewis, graduates of William Penn University, were additional instructors at the college. The 20-by-60-ft frame building held 100 students at its peak. Eighteen students graduated from the college before a dwindling community population caused it to close in 1893.

New county seat and decline

Estacado store owners  R. L. Stringfellow and H. E. Hume founded the Crosby County town of Emma in 1890. The new settlements began to attract Estacado residents who had been discouraged by harsh environmental conditions. On October 14, 1891, a county-wide election was held on where the county seat should be located. Estacado lost to Emma by only six votes. The Estacado courthouse building was moved to Emma, and much of the population along with it.

The Quakers moved elsewhere. In the early part of the 20th century, the population again increased, but never again had as many residents as it had in 1890.

See also

Blanco Canyon
Canyon Valley, Texas
Caprock Escarpment
Llano Estacado
Mount Blanco
West Texas
White River (Texas)
Yellow House Canyon

References

External links

Geography of Crosby County, Texas
Ghost towns in the Texas South Plains
Geography of Lubbock County, Texas
Populated places established in 1879
Quakerism in the United States
Recorded Texas Historic Landmarks
1879 establishments in Texas